The Augustusburg and Falkenlust Palaces form a historical building complex in Brühl, North Rhine-Westphalia, Germany. The buildings are connected by the spacious gardens and trees of the Schlosspark.  Built in the early 18th century, the palaces and adjoining gardens are considered masterpieces of early rococo architecture and have been listed as a UNESCO cultural World Heritage Site since 1984. Augustusburg Palace and its parks also serve as a venue for the Brühl Palace Concerts.

History 
The Augustusburg Caste was built on the foundations of a medieval castle in 1725. It was planned and funded by Archbishop-Elector of Cologne, Clemens August of Bavaria  of the Wittelsbach family, and designed by the architects Johann Conrad Schlaun and François de Cuvilliés. Shortly thereafter, François de Cuvilliés designed the Falkenlust hunting lodge to the southeast for Clemens August to practice falconry, and the lodge was built from 1729 to 1740.

The elaborate gardens surrounding the Augustusburg palace were designed by Dominique Girard.  An elaborate parterre for an area south of the palaces was also designed, but it was restructured by Peter Joseph Lenné in the 19th century and turned into a landscape garden. Attempts to renovate the area have proven difficult, due to poor source material availability.

From shortly after World War II until 1994, Augustusburg was used as a reception hall for guests of state by the German President, as it is not far from Bonn, which was the capital of the Federal Republic of Germany at that time.

Description 
The palace complex consists of the Augustusburg Palace and the smaller Falkenlust lodge roughly 1 mile to the southeast. The main block of Augustusburg Palace is a U-shaped building with three main storeys and two levels of attics. The three wings are made of brick with a roughcast plaster. Two orangeries adjoin the main building on the north and south sides. The magnificent main staircase was designed by Johann Balthasar Neumann and made of ornate marble, jasper and stucco. The main garden directly south of the Augustusberg Palace is a complex, embroidery-like parterre, with four fountains and a mirror pool, flanked by alleys lined with lime trees. A path runs diagonally south from this garden to the Felkenlust lodge.

The Falkenlust lodge was built in the style of a country home, drawing inspiration from the Amalienburg hunting lodge in the park of Nymphenburg Palace. The main building has two floors, flanked by two single-story buildings that housed the prince-elector's falcons. On the ground floor is an oval salon.

See also
 List of Baroque residences

References

External links
 Castles of Augustusburg and Falkenlust at Brühl : UNESCO Official Website

 Official website

Houses completed in 1740
World Heritage Sites in Germany
Rococo architecture in Germany
Palaces in North Rhine-Westphalia
Baroque architecture in North Rhine-Westphalia
Baroque palaces in Germany
Museums in North Rhine-Westphalia
Historic house museums in Germany
Gardens in North Rhine-Westphalia
Hunting lodges in Germany
Buildings and structures in Rhein-Erft-Kreis
1740 establishments in the Holy Roman Empire
Episcopal palaces in Germany